The Swat Motorway, also known as the M-16 or Swat Expressway, is a  four-lane motorway and provincial controlled-access highway in the Khyber Pakhtunkhwa province of Pakistan. Phase-1 of the project, completed in June 2019, connects the existing M-1 motorway at Nowshera to Chakdara while the under-construction second phase will extend the project to Fatehpur.

Route
The phase-1 of motorway stretches from Nowshera to Chakdara in Lower Dir District, passing through Swabi, Mardan, Malakand and Swat districts. The phase-1 of the project was inaugurated in August 2016. and opened for traffic on 3 June 2019  The phase-1 reduced the travel time from Nowshera to Chakdara from three hours to one hour. The Asian Development Bank and China provided the principal technical and financial assistance for the project, while Saudi Arabia pledged .

Phase two of the motorway will extend another 79 kilometers to the north and terminate at Fatehpur. It will pass through Chakdara, Shamozai, Barikot, Mingora, Kanju, Malam Jabba, Sher Palam, Matta Khwazakhela, and ends at Madayan-Fatehpur Interchange. On 16 July 2020, ECNEC approved land acquisition for Swat Motorway Phase-II at a cost of Rs. 20 bn. The Khyber Pakhtunkhwa government allocated Rs. 70 bn. for the extension The Swat motorway or M-16 should not be confused with the E90 Expressway (Besham–Khwazakhela Expressway) proposed by the National Highway Authority, which also terminates in Swat.

Swat Phase-II extension 
Swat Motorway phase-II will be completed under a public-private partnership. The length of the motorway will be 80-kilometer. It will connect Thana Baizai to Fatehpur. The cost of the project is Rs. 37 billion with an additional Rs. 20.5 billion for the purchase of land. It will have nine interchanges and eight bridges. The motorway would have four lanes with the future possibility of extending it to six lanes.

On 11 March 2021, a summary was presented before ECNEC regarding 10,000 kanal land acquisition for Swat Motorway phase-II to be sponsored by the Government of Khyber Pakhtunkhwa and executed by Pakhtunkhwa Highway Authority (PKHA) (through Federal PSDP) equal to RS.20,000 million for construction of about 80 km 04-lane motorway from Chakdara to Fatehpur.

The Committee approved the said project and strongly recommended to complete such projects on Public Private Partnership (PPP) basis.

https://pakobserver.net/ecnec-approves-4-lane-sambrial-kharian-motorway/

See also
 Motorways of Pakistan
 Provincial Highways of Khyber Pakhtunkhwa
 E90 Expressway
 Malam Jabba ski resort
 Tourism in Pakistan
Peshawar–D.I. Khan motorway

Notes 

Motorways in Pakistan
Expressways in Khyber Pakhtunkhwa
Roads in Khyber Pakhtunkhwa